Jesús Luis "Koldo" Álvarez de Eulate Güergue (born 4 September 1970) is a former footballer who played as a goalkeeper, currently manager of Andorra.

Playing career
Born in Vitoria-Gasteiz, Álava, Basque Country, Spain, Álvarez spent his entire career in the country. He signed in the 1990 summer transfer window with Atlético Madrid from local CD Aurrerá de Vitoria, but struggled to appear even for the reserves. Due to injury to starter Abel Resino, he was on the substitutes bench for the first team in the final of the 1990–91 Copa del Rey, against RCD Mallorca.

Álvarez resumed his career in the lower leagues, being second or third choice. In 1994, he signed with FC Andorra which competed in the Spanish football league system, going on to remain with the club for 14 of the following 15 seasons and retiring at nearly 39 years of age. After being naturalised, he began appearing with the Andorra national team, making his debut on 3 June 1998 in a 3–0 friendly loss to Brazil.

On 10 June 2009, Álvarez played his last international, a 0–6 defeat against England for the 2010 FIFA World Cup qualifiers; arguably one of the best players in the match, he received a standing ovation from the opposing fans for his efforts, after he was substituted in injury time. Previously, in November 2003, to celebrate UEFA's Jubilee, he was selected as Andorra's Golden Player by the Andorran Football Federation as their most outstanding player of the past 50 years.

Coaching career
Álvarez was appointed as the Andorra national team's manager on 2 February 2010, replacing David Rodrigo. His first win (on his 49th game in charge) came seven years and 20 days later, 2–0 over fellow minnows San Marino in a friendly. 

On 25 March 2017, nearly 12 years after the last point won in official matches, Álvarez led the side to a 0–0 draw with Faroe Islands for the 2018 World Cup qualifying campaign. On 9 June, for the same competition, a 1–0 win against Hungary in Andorra la Vella was achieved, the first competitive one since October 2004.

Personal life
Álvarez's son, Iker, is also a footballer and a goalkeeper. He was coached by his father in the national team setup.

Statistics

Club

International

Managerial statistics

Honours
Atlético Madrid
Copa del Rey: 1990–91

References

External links

1970 births
Living people
Spanish emigrants to Andorra
Naturalised citizens of Andorra
Footballers from Vitoria-Gasteiz
Spanish footballers
Andorran footballers
Association football goalkeepers
Segunda División B players
Tercera División players
Atlético Madrid B players
CD Toledo players
Atlético Madrid footballers
UD Salamanca players
FC Andorra players
CF Balaguer footballers
Andorra international footballers
UEFA Golden Players
Andorran football managers
Andorra national football team managers
CD Aurrerá de Vitoria footballers